The Carron River is a river located in Far North Queensland, Australia.

Course and features
The river rises at the northern end of the Gregory Range and flows west to the north but roughly parallel with the Gulf Developmental Road until discharging into the Norman River of which it is a tributary near the town of Normanton. It flows thorough many temporary and permanent waterholes through the journey including Rope Hole.

The Carron has five tributaries including Rocky Creek, Foote Creek, Tabletop Creek, Ten Mile Creek and Telephone Creek.

The traditional owners of the area to the north of the Carron are the Walangama people and to the south are the Kurtjar people. The river is named after William Carron, second in command of the Edmund Kennedy expedition in 1848. Carron was the expedition botanist and one of the three survivors of the venture.

Severe flooding was also experienced in 2011.

See also

References

Rivers of Far North Queensland